FanDraft is a fantasy sports software application created by FanSoft Media. The application acts as a digital alternative to the traditional "paper draft boards" utilized during many live fantasy football drafts. The software has over 27,000 downloads on Download.com, and has been featured on major media sites such as Wall Street Journal, USA Today Online, and Telegram.com, and boasts integration partnerships with RotoWire and MyFantasyLeague 
FanDraft provides software specifically designed to make a draft easier and more aesthetically pleasing. FanDraft is installed into your laptop, then the display can be hooked  up to a big-screen TV or projector, and the entire league has a display for the view. When a pick is made, the commissioner clicks on the player's name, and he is added to the squad. He then joins the scrolling "bottom line" that updates picks while the clock starts on the next owner. The software also allows the commissioner to program personal music for each team, which will play when it's their turn to pick.

Background
FanDraft Football version 1 was first launched in May 2002. A rehauled update to version 2 was released a couple of months later.
Starting in 2020, FanDraft converted from being a desktop software into an online application.

FanDraft currently carries titles for 4 different fantasy sports that include football, baseball, basketball, and hockey.
FanDraft released its first baseball application (FanDraft Baseball) in 2008. The Basketball version was first released in 2007, and continued to release updates until 2009.  FanDraft Basketball was discontinued from 2010-2012, however relaunched in 2013. FanDraft Hockey was first released in 2009 to continued to release annual updates. FanDraft has also released a non-fantasy title called "FanDraft Youth Sports" in 2009, which serves as a draft board software for youth sports leagues.

References

External links
 Official site
 FanDraft Baseball

Fantasy sports